Sofia Boutella (born 3 April 1982) is an Algerian actress, model, and dancer.

Early life
Boutella was born in the Bab El Oued district of Algiers, Algeria, to an architect mother and a jazz musician father, Safy Boutella. Her brother, Seif, works as a visual effects artist in the entertainment industry. Her surname means "the men of the mountains". She was raised in a fairly secular household that cultivated artistic expression and creativity. Boutella described her childhood as a happy one, stating that she was "blessed to be born into a family that allowed me to express myself, to be myself and let out all sorts of colours that were living in my imagination and in my heart."

With her family's encouragement, Boutella started classical dance education when she was five years old. In 1992, at the age of 10, she left Algeria with her family in the midst of the Algerian Civil War and moved to France. Shortly thereafter, she started rhythmic gymnastics, joining the French national team at age 18.

Dancing career
Growing up in Paris, Boutella was exposed to many more forms of dance, particularly hip hop and street-dance, which intrigued her for offering more "freedom" compared to the more disciplined styles of ballet and gymnastics. She joined a group called the Vagabond Crew, which won the Battle of the Year in 2006, and participated in a spin-off group called "Chienne de Vie and Aphrodites".

Her breakthrough as a dancer came in 2007, when she was picked for the Jamie King choreography for Nike Women's "Keep Up" campaign, serving as a role model of femininity and hip-hop. This was a major boost to her career and led to more work alongside stars like Madonna, in her Confessions Tour, and Rihanna. She credits her work with Madonna for helping her learn English.

Boutella successfully auditioned for the Michael Jackson This Is It concerts but could not attend due to the extension of the Madonna tour, whose dates coincided with the Jackson tour. She was the main character in the music video for "Hollywood Tonight" by Michael Jackson in February 2011.

Acting career

Beginning at age 17, Boutella rehearsed with famed Spanish choreographer Blanca Li. She began dancing in film and television shows, as well as in commercials and concert tours.

She played the lead character Eva in the drama film StreetDance 2 (2012), the sequel to StreetDance 3D (2010).

In 2014, after 12 years as a dancer, Boutella sought a career in acting. Initially, she purposefully avoided auditioning for lead roles, wishing to play supporting characters so as to learn from more experienced actors. In 2015, she appeared in her first major film, Kingsman: The Secret Service, which jump-started her career as an actress. One year later, she appeared as the alien warrior Jaylah in Star Trek Beyond, released on 22 July 2016.

In 2017, she portrayed a French secret agent in the David Leitch film Atomic Blonde, which also featured Charlize Theron, James McAvoy, John Goodman and Toby Jones. The same year, she played the titular role in The Mummy, along with Tom Cruise, Russell Crowe and Annabelle Wallis.

Beginning in 2018, Boutella's profile rose, and she began to appear in more central roles. That year, she appeared in the Gaspar Noé dark psychological horror film Climax, starred alongside Michael B. Jordan and Michael Shannon in the HBO drama film Fahrenheit 451, and portrayed French contract killer 'Nice' in the near-future action crime thriller Hotel Artemis, alongside Jodie Foster, Jeff Goldblum, and Dave Bautista.

In October 2019, she starred in episode 5 of the first season of Amazon Prime's Modern Love.

In November 2021, Boutella was cast in the sci-fi adventure film Rebel Moon directed by Zack Snyder for Netflix.

SAS: Rogue Heroes was released in 2022.

Personal life
Boutella has cited Fred Astaire, Jean-Michel Basquiat, Daniel Day-Lewis and Bob Fosse as artistic influences.

Although she has lived mostly in France since age 10, Boutella maintains strong ties to her Algerian roots and identity:
From March 2014 until October 2018 Boutella was in a relationship with Irish actor Robert Sheehan.

Music videos

 Cesária Évora – "Nutridinha" (2001)
 Jamiroquai – "Little L" (2001)
 Matt Pokora – "Showbiz (The Battle)" (2004)
 BodyRockers – "I Like the Way (You Move)" (2005)
 Axwell – "Feel the Vibe ('Til the Morning Comes)" (2005)
 Madonna – "Hung Up" (2005)
 Madonna – "Sorry" (2006)
 Rihanna – "SOS (Nike Version)" (2006)
 Chris Brown – "Wall to Wall" (2007)
 Matt Pokora – "Dangerous" (2008)
 Madonna – "Celebration" (2009)
 Usher – "Hey Daddy (Daddy's Home)" (2009)
 Beat Freaks/Geminiz – "Jump II" (2010)
 Ne-Yo – "Beautiful Monster" (2010)
 Ne-Yo – "Champagne Life" (2010)
 Michael Jackson – "Hollywood Tonight" (2011)
 Take That – "Get Ready For It" (2015)
 Thirty Seconds to Mars – "Rescue Me" (2018)
 Madonna – "God Control" (2019)
Foo Fighters – "Shame Shame" (2020)
 Silas Bassa – "Katia the runaway" (2020)

Filmography

References

Further reading

External links

 
 Talent Portfolio for Sofia Boutella at AMCK Management
 Model Portfolio at IMG Models

1982 births
Living people
People from Bab El Oued
People from Algiers
21st-century Algerian actresses
21st-century French actresses
Algerian emigrants to France
Algerian film actresses
Algerian television actresses
Algerian female dancers
Algerian female models
French female dancers
Breakdancers
Hip hop dancers
Algerian rhythmic gymnasts
French rhythmic gymnasts
Algerian expatriates in the United States
Berklee College of Music alumni